Craspedocephalus wiroti, also known commonly as Wirot's pit viper, is a species of venomous pitviper in the family Viperidae. The species is native to Southeast Asia.

Etymology
The specific name, wiroti, is in honor of Thai herpetologist Wirot Nutaphand (1932–2005).

Geographic range
C. wiroti is found in Peninsular Malaysia and Thailand.

Habitat

Behavior
C. wiroti is arboreal.

Reproduction
C. wiroti is oviparous.

References

Further reading
Chan-ard T, Parr JWK, Nabhitabhata J (2015). A Field Guide to the Reptiles of Thailand. New York: Oxford University Press. 352 pp.  (hardcover),  (paperback). (Trimeresurus wiroti, p. 348).
Das I (2012). A Naturalist's Guide to the Snakes of South-East Asia: Malaysia, Singapore, Thailand, Myanmar, Borneo, Sumatra, Java and Bali. Oxford, England: John Beaufoy Publishing. 176 pp. .
Trutnau L (1981). Schlangen im Terrarium: Haltung, Pflege und Zucht in zwei Bänden. Band 2. Giftschlangen [= Snakes in the Terrarium: Keeping, Care and Breeding, in Two Volumes. Volume 2. Venomous Snakes ]. Stuttgart: Eugen Ulmer Verlag. 200 pp., 63 color plates. . (Trimeresurus wiroti, new species, p. 188). (in German).

wiroti
Snakes of Southeast Asia
Reptiles of Malaysia
Reptiles of Thailand
Reptiles described in 1981